Jamie McKernon (born 1 April 1992) is a Scottish footballer who plays for Troon. He has previously played in the Scottish Premier League for St Mirren.

Career
On 22 August 2010, McKernon made his first team debut for St Mirren as a substitute against Celtic, coming on for Garry Brady in a 4–0 defeat. This was followed up with another substitute appearance against St Johnstone on 14 May 2011. In the subsequent seasons he was sent on loan to Scottish Football League sides Ayr United and East Stirlingshire.

Jamie had his contract with St Mirren terminated by mutual consent on 13 March 2013. He joined Junior side Glenafton Athletic in August 2013 under Manager Tommy Bryce and helped the New Cumnock club reach the Scottish Junior Cup final in 2014 before lifting the Ardagh Cup in 2014-15.

McKernon stepped back up to Scottish League One side Queen's Park in the summer of 2015 spending two seasons at Hampden Park. He re-joined Glenafton in the summer of 2018 under Craig McEwan, before again returning to Queens Park the following summer. Brown Ferguson signed McKernon for Stenhousemuir in the summer of 2019, before he returned to the Junior leagues to join the ambitious Darvel in October 2019.

In March 2021, McKernon joined Scottish League Two side Albion Rovers before returning to Glenafton for a third spell in November 2021 under his former team-mate Mick McCann.

McKernon joined WOSFL Premier Division side Troon in February 2023.

Career statistics

References

1992 births
Living people
St Mirren F.C. players
Ayr United F.C. players
East Stirlingshire F.C. players
Glenafton Athletic F.C. players
Queen's Park F.C. players
Troon F.C. players
Scottish Premier League players
Scottish Football League players
Scottish Junior Football Association players
Association football midfielders
Stenhousemuir F.C. players
Scottish footballers
Albion Rovers F.C. players